22473/22474 Bandra Terminus–Bikaner Superfast Express is a Superfast train belonging to North Western Railway zone that runs between  and  in India. It is currently being operated with 22473/22474 train numbers on a weekly basis.

Service

22473/Bikaner–Bandra Terminus Superfast Express has an average speed of 55 km/hr and covers 1212 km in 21h 55m.
22474/Bandra Terminus–Bikaner Superfast Express has an average speed of 55 km/hr and covers 1212 km in 22h 00m.

Route and halts 

The important halts of the train are:

Schedule

Coach composition

The train has standard ICF rakes with max speed of 110 kmph. The train consists of 21 coaches:

 1 AC II Tier
 4 AC III Tier
 8 Sleeper coaches
 6 General
 2 Seating cum Luggage Rake

Traction

Both trains are hauled by an Electric Loco Shed, Vadodara-based WAP-5 or WAP-4E electric locomotive from Bandra to Ahmedabad. From Ahmedabad trains are hauled by a Diesel Loco Shed, Ajmer-based WDM-3A diesel locomotives uptil Bikaner, and vice versa.

Rake sharing 

The train shares its rake with 12495/12496 Pratap Express.

Notes

References 

Transport in Mumbai
Transport in Bikaner
Express trains in India
Rail transport in Maharashtra
Rail transport in Gujarat
Rail transport in Rajasthan
Railway services introduced in 2012